Jordanne Jones (born 7 August 2000) is an Irish actress. She began her career as a child actress, earning a Dublin Film Critics' Circle Award as well as an IFTA nomination for her debut film role in Frank Berry's I Used to Live Here.

In 2016 and 2019, she played Minnie Mahon in the RTÉ One miniseries Rebellion and Resistance. Her lead performance in Metal Heart earned her the Bingham Ray award for Best Newcomer at the Galway Film Fleadh in 2018. She was named one of Screen International's 2019 Stars of Tomorrow.

She appeared in short films for spoken word artist and actor Emmet Kirwan, and musicians Dermot Kennedy and Lilla Vargen. 
She presented an award alongside actor Robert Sheehan.

Early life
Jones is from Killinarden, Tallaght, South Dublin. She is the daughter of Senator Lynn Ruane, with whom she successfully campaigned to repeal the Eighth Amendment to the Constitution which had restricted abortion rights. Ruane was only 15 years old when she gave birth to Jones.

Jones attended Killinarden Community School. She went on to train at the Bow Street Young Filmmakers Academy and study English and Film at Trinity College Dublin.

Personal life
Jones was diagnosed with Asperger syndrome when she was 17. She held an event for people on the autism spectrum at the Science Gallery Dublin, her place of work at the time, in 2019.

Filmography

Film

Television

Music videos

Awards and nominations

References

External links
 

2000 births
Living people
21st-century Irish actresses
Actresses from County Dublin
Alumni of the Bow Street Academy
People from Tallaght
People with Asperger syndrome